Ali Shahrokhi (born 11 March 1988) is an Iranian male discus thrower, who won an individual gold medal at the Youth World Championships.

References

External links

1988 births
Living people
Iranian male discus throwers